The Casio Casiotone MT-40 is an electronic keyboard, formerly produced by Casio and originally developed for the consumer market. It was released in 1981.

Description 
The keyboard has 37 main keys and 15 smaller bass keys. Its 9-voice polyphony means that eight notes may be played on the main keys, plus one note on the bass for a total of nine simultaneous voices. The bass section has one timbre, and the main section has 22, assignable to one of four presets. Like most small Casio keyboards the MT-40 has a drum section with 6 different beats, a tempo knob, and a "fill" button. The fill button plays sixteenth note pulses of either the "snare" or "kick" as long as it is held down. 

All tones and presets are recordings held on "voice chips" triggered by user input. This consumer-grade feature distinguishes the MT-40 from the technical definition of synthesizer, a machine in which sounds are generated by manipulating the output of audio frequency generators rather than recordings of those manipulations. The successor of the MT-40 was an otherwise identical machine that came in a gray case, sold as the MT-41 beginning in 1983.

Under Me Sleng Teng 

The MT-40 has a built-in bassline (internally referred to as the "rock" preset) that, along with the keyboard's suggested 1/16 note fill for that preset, formed the basis of a seminal reggae track, 1985's "Under Me Sleng Teng". The track's riddim went on to spawn nearly 500 cover versions. This song's success is widely credited with single-handedly transitioning reggae from analog to computerized production. This transition to a music production that depended on digital instruments and sequencers is also seen as catalyzing the computerization of hip-hop music, which was, like reggae, an analog musical tradition until the mid-1980s. Given the lasting consequences of the Sleng Teng riddim, the MT-40's "rock" preset has been the subject of considerable speculation.

The famous preset was composed for Casio in 1980 by a then newly-hired music engineer, Hiroko Okuda. She was assigned to create several of the keyboard's presets, among them a "rock" rhythm. Okuda had been hired fresh out of music school, where she had produced one of Japan's first graduate theses on reggae. In 2022 she described herself as having been immersed in reggae for several years before her 1980 hire by Casio (the previous year, during Bob Marley's only visit to Japan, Okuda had attended more than three performances from the tour). Okuda only learned of her part in "Under Me Sleng Teng"'s global success in August of 1986, when she read an article titled “The Sleng Teng Flood” in Japan's Music Magazine. The article described the wave of dozens and dozens of reggae songs being produced in Jamaica, all based on a Casiotone keyboard preset.

Reaction to MT-40 "rock" preset 
After the worldwide success of Sleng Teng many speculated as to the ultimate source of the "rock" preset. At first Eddie Cochran's 1958 song "Somethin' Else" or the Sex Pistols' 1976 track "Anarchy in the UK" were thought to be prime candidates, with "Somethin' Else" being widely accepted for decades by connoisseurs. In 2015 Okuda was quoted as saying the source was a track on an unnamed 1970's British rock album. This was later speculated to be David Bowie's "Hang On to Yourself", the 8th track on his 1972 album The Rise and Fall of Ziggy Stardust and the Spiders from Mars. However, referring to the question in 2022, Okuda said, “I did use to listen to a lot of British rock, so I’m sure there must have been songs that influenced me. But really, the bassline was something I came up with myself. It wasn’t based on any other tune.”

According to Okuda, there was some talk at the Casio corporation of attempting to defend their intellectual property from its free use in "Under Me Sleng Teng" with lawsuits. However, other voices at Casio (among them the head of the Musical Instrument division, co-founder of the company, and second-eldest Kashio brother, Toshio Kashio) prevailed. Toshio Kashio in particular felt strongly that the company's mission ought to be “bringing the pleasure of playing a musical instrument to everyone.” Despite the minute size and financial importance of the Musical Instrument division compared to the company's calculator division, then its main breadwinner, Toshio Kashio's defence of free use set a decisive corporate precedent. To the present day Casio's response to clearance requests for the "rock" preset has been an acknowledgement that the song “uses a sound file taken from a Casio MT-40”, and no fee.

The preset is accessed by pressing the "synchro" button and then the "D" bass button (second from left) while the MT-40 rhythm slider is in the "rock" position.

Subsequent Influence 
The MT-40 has also secured a niche in indie music, frequently used by the Magnetic Fields, and featured on most of Emperor X's album Tectonic Membrane/Thin Strip on an Edgeless Platform. Its thin fuzz can be heard on lesser known Australian indie band Turnstyle's top 20 single "Spray Water on the Stereo". California-based indie rock group Picture Atlantic used a mixture of the MT-40's organ sound and bass notes for their tracks "Circe", "Anytime/Coats of Armor", and "....That's Just Me" on their album Kleos. San Francisco indie rock duo Casy and Brian exclusively used the Casio MT-40 for three of their four releases, altering its sound with effects such as overdrive pedals to accompany drums. Former Boston/San Francisco street musician The Space Lady plays the MT-40 through a Small Stone phase shifter to create an ethereal tone to accompany her delay-enhanced vocals. In the UK the Farmer's Boys used it on a number of singles and album tracks. Post-punk band Standing Ovation use the MT-40 for synth pad and stabs on their cassette release "What Meaning" in 1983, re-released on vinyl in 2019 In 2015, Japanese musician Tentenko (formerly of BiS) released an album recorded using the keyboard as the only accompanying instrument. Damon Albarn of Gorillaz used an MT-40 to construct the demo and live versions of the second single from the band's 2017 album Humanz, the track "We Got the Power".

References

Casio synthesizers